Sky Punks is a 2015 endless racing freemium video game developed by Fathom Interactive and published by Rovio Stars.

Gameplay
Sky Punks is an endless racing game. Different characters' stories remain mysteries until these stories are collected during gameplay. The game features crystals and coins that the player finds or using real money to purchase that unlocks new abilities and Glide wings to use in Neo Terra.

References

External links
 

2015 video games
Android (operating system) games
IOS games
Racing video games
Rovio Entertainment games
Video games developed in Canada